Orlin Ognyanov Starokin (born 8 January 1987) is a former Bulgarian footballer of Russian origin who played mainly as a left wingback.

Career

Youth career
Starokin began his footballing career with the CSKA Sofia youth team. There he played as an offensive midfielder. He improved his skills at the academy until 2005.

Naftex
At the age of 18, in 2005, Starokin went to Burgas and signed his first professional contract with Naftex. At Naftex he played at first as a left winger and left back. In his first season in professional football, Starokin earned 19 appearances playing in the top division, scoring one goal.

Chernomorets Burgas
In the summer of 2006 Starokin was on loan to Chernomorets Burgas, with whom he became champion of the second division. Later he was bought and played there until 2011.

Levski Sofia
On 14 June 2011, he signed for Levski Sofia. On 2 July 2011, Starokin made his unofficial debut for Levski in the 1:0 win against Loko Sofia in an exhibition match.

In June 2014 Starokin refused to renew his contract with Levski and decided to leave the club after 3 years and 71 appearances in which he scored 4 goals.

Irtysh Pavlodar
Later he signed a contract with FC Irtysh Pavlodar in Kazakhstan. Starokin left Irtysh in November 2014, following the conclusion of the season.

Botev Plovdiv
After a short spell at FC Dinamo București, on 31 August 2015, Orlin Starokin joined Botev Plovdiv until the end of the season. He made an official debut on 12 September during the 0–2 home defeat from Litex Lovech.

Cherno More
On 14 June 2017, Starokin joined Cherno More. On 21 July 2017, he made his debut in 4–0 away win over Vereya, playing as defensive midfielder.

Alki Oroklini
On 30 June 2018, Starokin signed a one-year contract with Cypriot club Alki Oroklini.

International career
In late August 2017, Starokin earned his first call-up to the national team, for the 2018 World Cup qualifiers against Sweden and the Netherlands, but did not debut.

Career statistics

References

External links
 
 Profile at LevskiSofia.info

1987 births
Living people
Footballers from Sofia
Bulgarian footballers
Neftochimic Burgas players
PFC Chernomorets Burgas players
PFC Levski Sofia players
FC Irtysh Pavlodar players
FC Lokomotiv 1929 Sofia players
FC Dinamo București players
Botev Plovdiv players
OFC Pirin Blagoevgrad players
PFC Cherno More Varna players
FC Vitosha Bistritsa players
Alki Oroklini players
First Professional Football League (Bulgaria) players
Kazakhstan Premier League players
Liga I players
Cypriot First Division players
Bulgarian expatriate footballers
Bulgarian expatriate sportspeople in Kazakhstan
Bulgarian expatriate sportspeople in Romania
Bulgarian expatriate sportspeople in Cyprus
Expatriate footballers in Kazakhstan
Expatriate footballers in Romania
Expatriate footballers in Cyprus
Association football fullbacks
Association football midfielders